was an essayist and former geisha.

Biography 
Nakamura was born on April 14, 1913 in Hokkaido or Tokyo, Japan. Her birth name was Kazuko Yamamoto.

In 1929, at age of 16, she became a geisha at a geisha house in Shinbashi. She learned English, and gained a reputation as the first English-speaking geisha. Some of her clients included Babe Ruth, Jean Cocteau, and Charlie Chaplin. Nakamura was also the first woman in Japan to get a pilot's license. 

She worked until 27 years old, when she married Shintaro Ota in 1940, a Japanese diplomat, and moved with him to Kolkata, India. Nakamura divorced Ota soon after giving birth to her son, and they returned to Japan in 1942. She then married Masaya Nakamura, a photographer.

After divorcing Masaya Nakamura in 1956, Nakamura moved to the United States. She consulted on many operas, books, and films about geisha life, including productions of Madame Butterfly and Arthur Golden's Memoirs of a Geisha. Nakamura also worked to change misconceptions about geisha. She lived in New York City until her death in 2004.

Selected bibliography

References 

2004 deaths
1913 births
People from Tokyo
Japanese essayists
Geishas